Samtskhe–Javakheti is a region (mkhare) in southern Georgia with a population of 151.110 (2021) and an area of . The region has Akhaltsikhe as its administrative center, while Besik Amiranashvili is governor of the region since August 2018. Samtskhe–Javakheti is compiled of the historical Georgian provinces Meskheti, Javakheti and Tori.

The Baku-Tbilisi-Ceyhan oil pipeline, the South Caucasus natural gas pipeline, and the Kars–Tbilisi–Baku railway pass through the region.

Geography 

Samtskhe–Javakheti borders Adjara and Guria in the northwestern tip, Imereti in the north, Shida Kartli in the northeast and Kvemo Kartli in the east. The southern border is formed by Armenia, the southwestern flank borders Turkey. The region covers the Javakheti Plateau, a highland of volcanic origin and the northern extension of the Armenian highlands. The plains are between 1500-2000 meters above sea level. Samtskhe–Javakheti is bordered by several mountain ranges, the most important being the Meskheti Range and Trialeti Range in the north and the Samsari Range and Javakheti Range in the east.

The highlands are home to some of Georgia's largest lakes, such as Paravani Lake, Tabatskuri Lake, Khanchali Lake and Kartsakhi Lake. Georgia's largest river, the Mtkvari, flows through the region from Turkey, a few miles north of Kartsakhi Lake. The river has carved a canyon through in the highlands and forms the eastern boundary of the Erusheti Highlands, a mountain range along the border with Turkey. In this gorge the large historic cave monastery Vardzia is situated, an important tourist attraction. The river flows initially in a northwesterly direction through the gorge to Akhaltsikhe via Khertvisi Fortress where the Paravani River joins the Mtkvari. The river gorge has a depth of approximately 500 meters. At Akhaltsikhe the river turns to the northeast and streams to Borjomi between the Meskheti Range (left bank) and Trialeti Range (right bank), after which the river leaves the region through the Shida Kartli plain.

Due to its high location, the region has cold and snowy winters. In the northern situated Bakuriani, not far from the tourist attraction Borjomi, there is a ski resort.

Subdivisions

The region has six municipalities with 82 administrative communities (temi) and a total of 271 populated settlements:
 Five cities: Akhaltsikhe, Akhalkalaki, Borjomi, Vale and Ninotsminda
 Two dabas: Kharistvala, Lentekhi
 Villages: 259

Demographic
According to data from the National Statistical Bureau of Georgia, Samtskhe–Javakheti had 151,110 inhabitants as of January 1, 2021, a decrease of 6% compared to the 2014 census. Of these, 35.9% live in urban areas and 64.1% in rural villages. Akhaltsikhe and Akhalkalaki are the most densely populated municipalities.

Ethnic Groups
In 1926, the Akhaltsikhe Uyezd (corresponding to Meskheti or Samtskhe) had a population of:
 Meskhetian Turks - 49,170 (50.7%)
 Georgians - 24,353 (25.1%)
 Armenians - 15,565 (16.1%)
 Kurds - 3,094 (3.2%)
 other ethnic groups - 4,591 (4.9%)

In 1926, the Akhalkalaki Uyezd (corresponding to Javakheti) had a population of:
 Armenians - 57,791 (73.2%)
 Georgians - 7,565 (9.6%)
 Meskhetian Turks - 6,940 (8.8%)
 Russians - 2,492 (3.2%)
 other ethnic groups - 4,149 (5.2%)

In 2002, Samtskhe–Javakheti province ethnic makeup of 207,598 total population:
 Armenians - 113,347
 Georgians - 89,995
 Abkhazians - 42
 Ossetians - 822
 Russians - 2,230
 Azerbaijanis - 59
 Greeks - 740
 Ukrainians - 162
 Kists - 
 Yazidis - 1

In 2014, Samtskhe–Javakheti province of Georgia had the following ethnic makeup of 160,504 total population:
 Armenians - 81,089 (50.52%)
 Georgians - 77,498 (48.28%)
 Russians - 712 (0.44%)
 other ethnic groups - 1,194 (0.74%)

History
The current division of Georgia into "regions" (Mkhare) was introduced by the Shevardnadze government in the mid-1990s, partly as a response to the secession of Abkhazia and the South Ossetia conflict. Samtskhe–Javakheti was basically formed by combining the two traditional provinces of Meskheti (Samtskhe) and Javakheti.

Meskheti
The ancient tribes of Meskhi (or Moschi) and Mosiniks are the first known inhabitants of the area. Some scholars credit the Mosiniks (or Mossynoeci) with the invention of iron metallurgy. From the 2nd millennium to the 4th century BC, Meskheti was believed to be part of the Kingdom of Diauehi, in the 4th century BC to the 6th century AD part of the Kingdom of Iberia. From the 10th to the 15th century it was part of the united Georgian Kingdom. In the 16th century Meskheti was integrated into the Safavid Empire, followed by the Ottoman Empire. After the conclusion of the Russo-Persian War of 1826-28, it was a part of Russian Tiflis Governorate from 1817 till 1829, from 1918 to 1921 part of the Democratic Republic of Georgia, and from 1921 to 1990 part of the Georgian SSR. After independence from the USSR Meskheti was reinstalled as a province of Georgia, and later cast into the new Samtskhe–Javakheti region.

Javakheti
In ancient sources, the region was recorded as Zabakha in 785 BC, by the king Argishti I of Urartu. According to Cyril Toumanoff, Javakheti was part of the Iberian duchy of Tsunda from the 4th or 3rd century BC. Saint Nino entered Iberia from Javakheti, and, following the course of the River Kura, she arrived in Mtskheta, the capital of the kingdom, once there, she eventually began to preach Christianity, which culminated by Christianization of Iberia.

In struggle against the Arab occupation, Bagrationi dynasty came to rule over Tao-Klarjeti and established the Kouropalatate of Iberia. rulers of Tao-Klarjeti fought the Arabs from there, gradually incorporating the surrounding lands of Samtskhe and Javakheti, along with a few other lesser lands, from the Arab dominance. For a long time the region became a cultural safe-house and one of the most important religious centers of Georgia.

In the mid-10th century, Javakheti was incorporated into Kingdom of Abkhazia. In 964 Leon III of Abkhazia extended his influence to Javakheti, during his reign was built Kumurdo Cathedral. In subsequent centuries, Javakheti was integral part of unified Georgian monarchy and had a period of significant development: lot of bridges, churches, monasteries, and royal residences (Lgivi, Ghrtila, Bozhano, Vardzia) were built. From the 11th century, the center of upper Javakheti became Akhalkalaki. From the 10th century, the center of lowland Javakheti was Tmogvi. From the 12th century, the domain was ruled by representatives of the feudal family of Toreli.

In the 15th century, Javakheti was incorporated to principality of Samtskhe-Saatabago. In the 16th century, the region, as well as the adjacent territories of western Georgia, was occupied by the Ottoman Empire. The Georgian population of Javakheti was displaced to inner regions of Georgia such as Imereti and Kartli. Those who remained gradually became Muslim.

As a result of the struggles of the Russian Empire with the Ottomans, Russian authorities settled Christian Armenians and Caucasus Greeks in the area after 1828. Armenian refugees from the Armenian genocide in the Ottoman Empire came in the early 20th century. Also a large number of Russian Doukhobor sect members settled the region.

Soviet era 
Georgia came fully under Soviet control in 1921, after the Red Army invasion of Georgia. The remaining Muslim minority in Meskheti, also known as "Meskhetian Turks", were deported in cattle-trucks to Central Asia by order of Stalin and settled within an area that overlaps the boundaries of the modern nations of Kazakhstan, Kyrgyzstan, and Uzbekistan. Today, many are still dispersed across those countries. Of the 100,000 forcibly deported, a total of 10,000 perished.

Tourist attractions
The major tourist attractions are the cave monasteries of Vardzia (which was founded by Queen Tamar in 1185), Vanis Kvabebi (which dates from the 8th century), Rabati Castle and Khertvisi Fortress. Also, among national visitors is very popular 10th century Sapara Monastery, Tmogvi fortress, and 8th century Zarzma monastery.

See also
Subdivisions of Georgia

References

External links
Friends at Dinner, Foes at Politics (about socio-economic problems of the region)
Obstacles Impeding the Regional Integration of the Javalkheti Region, an ECMI working paper (PDF format)

 
Regions of Georgia (country)
Historical regions of Georgia (country)